Lily Mackall (sometimes, Lillie Mackall) (1839 – December 12, 1861) was a messenger for Rose Greenhow, a Confederate spy during the American Civil War. Arrested with Greenhow, they were held under house arrest, although Mackall was allowed to leave freely and used this to smuggle out some of the most sensitive documents in her shoes. The pair were then confined in a single room, along with Greenhow's daughter. Greenhow noted that during this time, she and Mackall were "like Siamese twins, inseparable". On September 25, 1862, Mackall was ordered out of the house and prohibited from returning, on the direct orders of Allan Pinkerton; she fell ill in October, and eventually died, with Greenhow being prohibited from seeing her. She was buried at Oak Hill Cemetery in Washington, D.C.

References

Bibliography 

1862 deaths
American spies
Female wartime spies
Women in the American Civil War
1839 births
Burials at Oak Hill Cemetery (Washington, D.C.)